The golden grosbeak (Pheucticus chrysogaster), also known as golden-bellied grosbeak or southern yellow grosbeak, is a species of grosbeak in the family Cardinalidae. It is similar to, and has sometimes been considered conspecific with, the yellow grosbeak.

The golden grosbeak is found in Colombia, Ecuador, Peru, Trinidad and Tobago, and Venezuela. Its natural habitats are subtropical or tropical dry forests, subtropical or tropical moist montane forests, subtropical or tropical dry shrubland, and heavily degraded former forest.

Taxonomy

The golden grosbeak belongs to the taxonomic family Cardinalidae. Other members of this family include cardinals, buntings, and other grosbeaks. Its genus, Pheuticus (meaning "shy" in Greek), contains six extant species.

The golden grosbeak (P. chrysogaster) used to be considered a member of the same species as the black-thighed grosbeak (P. tibialis) and yellow grosbeak (P. chrysopeplus); collectively, they went under the name yellow grosbeak (P. chrysopeplus). Southern yellow grosbeak was the common name given to the subspecies of yellow grosbeak found in the South American Andes of Ecuador, Peru, Venezuela, and Columbia, now recognized as the separate species golden grosbeak. 
Recent phylogenetics supports the separation of these three species and suggests that the golden grosbeak is more closely related to the black-backed grosbeak (P. aureiventris) than to the black-thighed or yellow.

Pheucticus chrysogaster goes by several different English names: southern yellow grosbeak, golden-bellied grosbeak, or golden grosbeak. The multiplicity of names traces in part to the above history of taxonomic splitting. Golden grosbeak is now favored over the other names by the major taxonomic authorities, as reflected in frequently updated and popular websites like eBird.org and Neotropicalbirds.org.

Description
The body averages  in length. The bill is large and conical in shape, typical of most species in the family. The golden grosbeak is sexually dimorphic in plumage. Males are bright yellow with a black wing and back. They have white spots on their median and greater wing-coverts that wear over time, and older birds appear darker. The females have brown wings and brown streaks covering the head, flanks, back and rump. The immature of this species look similar to the female in plumage and is often not distinguishable in the field.

Behavior and ecology
This species is found up to 3000 meters in elevation in a large diversity of habitats, occurring in semi-open habitats, edges of the forest, and shrub. Primarily arboreal, the birds that are often found alone or in pairs.
The song is described as fast caroling that is a “rich melody, liquid and full”. Each individual has a large repertoire of songs. The call is a metallic ‘pink’.

Conservation status
The IUCN considers the golden grosbeak a species of Least Concern. This classification reflects the species' large range and stable population size (<30% decline over ten years or three generations).

Gallery

References

Pheucticus
Birds of the Sierra Nevada de Santa Marta
Birds of the Venezuelan Coastal Range
Birds of Ecuador
Birds of the Peruvian Andes
Birds described in 1832
Taxa named by René Lesson
Taxonomy articles created by Polbot